The following Union Army units and commanders fought in the Savannah campaign (or Sherman's March to the Sea) of the American Civil War. The Confederate order of battle is listed separately. Order of battle compiled from the army organization during the campaign.

Abbreviations used

Military rank
 MG = Major General
 BG = Brigadier General
 Col = Colonel
 Ltc = Lieutenant Colonel
 Maj = Major
 Cpt = Captain
 Lt = 1st Lieutenant
 Bvt = Brevet

Union Forces
MG William T. Sherman, Commanding

Headquarters guard:
 7th Company Ohio Sharpshooters: Lt James Cox

Engineers:
 1st Missouri Engineers (5 companies): Ltc William Tweeddale

Right Wing (Army of the Tennessee)
MG Oliver O. Howard
Escort:
 Company K, 15th Illinois Cavalry: Lt John A. McQueen
 4th Company Ohio Cavalry: Cpt John L. King

XV Corps

MG Peter J. Osterhaus

XVII Corps

MG Francis Preston Blair, Jr.
Escort:
 Company G, 11th Illinois Cavalry: Cpt Stephen S. Tripp

Left Wing (Army of Georgia)
MG Henry W. Slocum

Pontoniers:
 58th Indiana: Col George P. Buell

XIV Corps

Bvt MG Jefferson C. Davis

XX Corps

BG Alpheus S. Williams

Cavalry Corps

See also

 Georgia in the American Civil War

Notes

References
 U.S. War Department, The War of the Rebellion: a Compilation of the Official Records of the Union and Confederate Armies. Washington, DC: U.S. Government Printing Office, 1880–1901.

American Civil War orders of battle